The 1991 Austin yogurt shop killings are an unsolved quadruple homicide which took place at an I Can't Believe It's Yogurt! shop in Austin, Texas, United States on Friday, December 6, 1991. The victims were four teenage girls: 13-year-old Amy Ayers (or Ayres), 17-year-old Eliza Thomas, 17-year-old Jennifer Harbison and Jennifer's 15-year-old sister Sarah. Jennifer and Eliza were employees of the shop, while Sarah and her friend Amy were in the shop to get a ride home with Jennifer after it closed at 11:00 pm. Approximately one hour before closing time, a man who had tried to hustle customers in his queue was permitted to use the toilet in back, took a very long time and may have jammed a rear door open. A couple who left the shop just before 11:00 pm, when Jennifer locked the front door to prevent more customers entering, reported seeing two men at a table acting furtively.

Around midnight a police patrolman reported a fire in the shop, and first responders discovered the bodies of the girls inside. The victims had been shot in the head; some had been raped. A .22 and a .380 pistol were used to commit the murders, and the perpetrator(s) probably exited out through a back door that was found unlocked. The organized method of operation, ability to control the victims, and destruction of evidence by arson pointed to an adult experienced in crime rather than teenagers, according to one of the original detectives on the case. Austin Police Department has DNA from an unknown male as a result of one of the rapes. A Y-chromosome match for the perpetrator DNA has been found in a research database of the Federal Bureau of Investigation (FBI) but it has declined to reveal the identity of the man in accordance with the law of anonymity for donors, and because thousands of men could bear this fragment of DNA, which is unable to identify individuals.

Killings

Shortly before midnight on Friday, December 6, 1991, a patrolman from the Austin Police Department noticed a fire coming from an I Can't Believe It's Yogurt! shop and reported it to his dispatcher. After the fire was extinguished, firefighters discovered four nude bodies. Each had been shot in the head execution style with a .22 caliber lead bullet. Sarah's hands had been bound behind her with a pair of panties and she had also been gagged and raped. Jennifer was not bound but her hands were behind her back. Eliza had been gagged and her hands were also tied behind her back. All three had been severely charred and shot in the back of the head.

Unlike the others, Amy's body was found in a separate part of the shop. She was not charred but she had received second- and "very early" third-degree burns on 25-30% of her body. She was found with a "sock-like cloth" around her neck. She had been shot the same as the others; however, the bullet had missed her brain. She also had a second bullet which had caused severe damage to her brain, exiting through her lateral cheek and jawline.  

Initial investigations had produced a large number of persons of interest, among them a 15-year-old caught with a .22 (not established to be the murder weapon) in a nearby mall days after the killings. Although he initially gave promising information, after tough questioning the detectives decided that he was trying to get himself out of the gun charge and eliminated him and three petty criminal friends whom he had implicated, none of whom were older than 17 at the time.

Several years later, a new detective on the case theorized that the four teens from 1991 were credible suspects. By that time, they were in their twenties. In a string of interrogations conducted by various detectives, confessions were obtained from some of the suspects. They said all four - Robert Springsteen, Michael Scott, Maurice Pierce, and Forrest Welborn - had participated in the murder. 

No record was kept of what was said to the men in the 1991 interrogations, making it impossible to know whether the detectives had supplied information to the suspects in the initial interrogations. Such information could be used to implicate the suspects in later interrogations, if they were to reference it. Two of the four were sent to trial, entirely due to their self-incriminating statements. The prosecution went into a great detail about the horrific nature of the crimes against the young victims, but presented no hard evidence other than the confessions. The two were convicted, one being sentenced to death and the other sentenced to life imprisonment because he had been 15 at the time. However, the prosecution's tactic of using excerpts of each one's alleged confessions at the other's trial was ruled to have violated the Confrontation Clause because the co-defendant was non-testifying. Both convictions were overturned on the Confrontation Clause alone, and the men were freed in 2009. The prosecution insisted they would be re-tried. However, forensic investigation showed that the DNA found in a victim was not theirs, nor was it that of the other two implicated in their confessions. The prosecution consequently abandoned plans for a retrial. Texas courts later decided that those released were not entitled to compensation as they had not proven they did not commit the crime.

One of the detectives in the interrogations, Hector Polanco, had been accused of coercing false confessions in the notorious case of  Christopher Ochoa and Richard Danziger. Both were released after 13 years in prison; Danziger was assaulted in prison which resulted in permanent brain damage.

Seven jurors from the trials have stated that they would not have convicted the men had this evidence been available at the time.

Subsequent events
At the time of the killings, a known serial killer, Kenneth Allen McDuff, was in the area. He had a history of multiple murders involving teenagers, but was soon ruled out. He was executed on November 17, 1998.

False confessions
Austin police admit that over 50 people, including McDuff on the day of his execution, had confessed to the yogurt shop murders. A confession in 1992 by two Mexican nationals, held by Mexican authorities, was soon disputed and finally ruled false.

2006: Springsteen conviction overturned
In 2006, the Texas Court of Criminal Appeals overturned Robert Springsteen's conviction on the basis of an unfair trial. The U.S. Supreme Court refused to reinstate the conviction in February 2007.

2008: Scott and Springsteen request DNA tests
On August 20, 2008, the defense lawyers for Scott and Springsteen requested DNA testing of alternative suspects. No matches against evidence discovered earlier that year were found. Seven jurors from the trials have stated that they would not have convicted the men had this evidence been available at the time.

2009: Release of Scott and Springsteen
On Wednesday, June 24, 2009, Judge Mike Lynch ruled, in response to Travis County District Attorney Rosemary Lehmberg's request that one of the trials be continued, that defendants Springsteen and Scott be freed on bond pending their upcoming trials. At 2:50 p.m. that day, they both walked out of the Travis County Jail with their attorneys.

Later that day, Lehmberg responded to Lynch's decision with the following statement:

Today I requested a continuance in the case against Michael Scott, a defendant in the yogurt shop murders, whose trial was scheduled to begin on July 6. Judge Mike Lynch granted that motion but also released both Michael Scott and Robert Springsteen on personal bond, as he indicated he would do in his previous scheduling order.

Requesting a delay in the case was a difficult decision but one that I believe is the best course toward an ultimate successful prosecution of this important matter.

Knowing that Judge Lynch would release both defendants, we requested certain conditions on their bonds, requiring them to remain in Travis County and report to the Court any change of residence, to have no contact with the victims' families or witnesses, that they not carry weapons or consume alcohol or illegal drugs, that they report to the Court on a routine basis, and attend all court appearances.

As you know, both Springsteen and Scott were convicted by juries in June 2001 and September 2002. Their convictions were then overturned by the appellate court, but their statements to law enforcement were found to be voluntarily given.

Since the original trial of these two men, new developments in DNA technology have become available. As we prepared for retrial, in March 2008, we submitted various evidentiary items for what is called YSTR testing. This test looks for male DNA only and is deemed to be the most accurate test for samples that are mixtures of female and male DNA, as in this case.

We sought this testing because we have an ongoing duty and responsibility to use the most up to date science available, to seek the truth in this and all the cases we prosecute.

Currently, it is clear to me that our evidence in the death of these four young women includes DNA from one male whose identity is not yet known to us. The defense asserts that the testing reveals more than one unknown male, but the evidence presented at the hearing on Thursday, June 18 contradicts that notion.

The reliable scientific evidence in the case presents one, and one only, unknown male donor. Given that, I could not in good conscience allow this case to go to trial before the identity of this male donor is determined, and the full truth is known. I remain confident that both Springsteen and Scott are responsible for the deaths at the yogurt shop, but it would not be prudent to risk a trial until we also know the nature of the involvement of this unknown male.

My office and the Austin Police Department remain committed to these cases. Their further investigation will continue to be a priority. My commitment to the victims, their families, and this community is that we will not give up until all of the people responsible for these terrible and tragic murders are brought to justice.

On October 28, 2009, all charges were dismissed against Scott and Springsteen.

2010: Death of Maurice Pierce
On December 23, 2010, Austin police officer Frank Wilson and his rookie partner, Bradley Smith, conducted a traffic stop on a vehicle driven by Maurice Pierce in the northern part of the city. After a brief foot pursuit, Pierce struggled with Wilson before removing a knife from his belt and stabbing Wilson in the neck. Wilson, who survived his injuries, subsequently pulled out his gun and shot and killed Pierce.

2021: Cold case legislation
On December 8, 2021, the House Judiciary Committee passed legislation from Rep. Michael McCaul giving the families of cold case victims the opportunity to petition the federal government to reexamine cases older than three years.

2022: DNA results
On February 5, 2022, it was announced that advanced DNA technology was bringing investigators closer than ever to solving the crime.

Legislation
On August 3, 2022, President Joe Biden signed The Homicide Victims’ Families’ Rights Act into law which was motivated by the Yogurt Shop Murders. The law is intended to help ensure federal law enforcement reviews sometimes decades-old cold case files and applies the latest technologies and investigative standards. The logistics aren’t clear in the bill, however, it states that people can request a cold case murder be reviewed by federal agencies. If the case qualifies, new eyes will investigate using the latest technologies to try to crack them.

Book
The murders were the subject of Beverly Lowry's 2016 nonfiction book Who Killed These Girls? Cold Case: The Yogurt Shop Murders, Corey Mitchell's 2016 nonfiction book Murdered Innocents and the novel See How Small by Scott Blackwood.

See also
 Las Cruces bowling alley massacre - Similar unsolved crime in 1990
 Brown's Chicken massacre
West Memphis Three

Murders in the Austin area:
 Murder of Jennifer Cave - Also in West Campus
 Murders of John Goosey and Stacy Barnett
 Celeste Beard

References

External links
 The Yogurt Shop Murders by Former Texas Assistant Attorney General Erik Moebius
 National Organization of Parents Of Murdered Children

Unsolved mass murders in the United States
1991 in Texas
Arson in Texas
Attacks in the United States in 1991
Attacks on restaurants in North America
Crimes in Austin, Texas
December 1991 events in the United States
December 1991 crimes
Massacres of women
Incidents of violence against girls
Deaths by firearm in Texas
History of women in Texas
1991 mass shootings in the United States